Nuits-Saint-Georges is a commune in the arrondissement of Beaune of the Côte-d'Or department in the Bourgogne-Franche-Comté region in Eastern France. In 2019, it had a population of 5,362.

Wine

Nuits-Saint-Georges is the main town of the Côte de Nuits wine-producing area of Burgundy.

Nuits-Saint-Georges was the site of the traditional Burgundian festival, la Saint-Vincent-Tournante, in 2007. It is a festival that celebrates the wine of a different Burgundian village each year.

Stone
The local marble is a sedimentary rock, a limestone, that is not susceptible to frost damage. It is fine-grained and capable of accepting a polish. There is a vein of this stone, called popularly "the Comblanchien" and extending from Nuits-Saint-Georges to Nevers, which has made the reputations of the quarries of the region. The stone will harmonize with any style by virtue of the variety of its shades of colour, the pink of bindweed (Convolvulus) and beige, and its grain.

Sport
Stage 7 of the 2017 Tour de France, finished here on the 7 July 2017. The stage was won by Marcel Kittel.

History
The town owes much to the economic development arising from Cistercian enterprise. The mayor of the town Franco de Martino brought them out of debt in 1905.

Administration

Demographics

Sights
 A short distance to the east is the Cîteaux Abbey, the mother house of the Cistercian order of monks. It was founded in 1098 and has, over the years much influenced Nuits-Saint-Georges.
 They built the Château du Clos Vougeot and the nearby villages of Saint-Nicolas-lès-Cîteaux and Saint-Bernard.
 Les Bolards is an archaeological site of a trading, crossroads town from the Gallo-Roman period.
 The municipal belfry was built in 1610.
 The church of Saint Symphorien was built in the 13th century. It amalgamates the Romanesque with the Gothic and contains an early carillon. In 2005, it is closed for renovation. (Details of the saint appear here.)
 In the church of Saint Denis, there is a fine organ by Aristide Cavaillé-Coll, a great organ builder of the 19th century who built those of Notre Dame in Paris.
 The Hôpital Saint-Laurent dates in origin from 1634 but the buildings are late 17th century. It has retained its hospital vocation which it supports by the annual sale of the products of its vineyards.
 The Château d'Entre-Deux-Monts is a private property but open each September for the journées du Patrimoine, heritage days.

International relations
 Hitchin, Hertfordshire, United Kingdom
 Bingen am Rhein, Germany
 Fuefuki, Yamanashi, Japan

Personalities
 François Thurot (1727-1760), privateer
 Paul Cabet (1815–1876), sculptor
 Félix Tisserand (1845–1896), astronomer
 Maurice Boitel (1919–2007), French painter
 Georges Faiveley and Camille Rodier, wine merchants, founders of the order of the knights of the Tastewine (Chevaliers du Tastevin)

See also
Communes of the Côte-d'Or department
French wine
 Route des Grands Crus

References

 (Tourisme) Patrimoine
 Map of the vineyards and descriptions

Bibliography
Both in French.
Nuits-Saint-Georges en Bourgogne, edited by the town of Nuits-Saint-Georges.
Lames de sang : La vie exemplaire de François Thurot, by Camille Bailly. (Blades of Blood : The exemplary life of François Thurot).

External links

 Official website of Nuits-Saint-Georges

Communes of Côte-d'Or
Burgundy